Fat cat is a slang term for a wealthy person, originally used to describe a rich political donor.

Fat Cat may also refer to:

Fat Cat (singer), a South Korean singer, also known as Defconn Girl
Fat Cat, Norwich, a pub in Norwich, England
Fat Cat Brewery, a brewery in Norwich, England
FatCat Records, a record label
Fat Cat, a sandwich offered at the Grease trucks in New Brunswick, NJ
Fat Cat, the main character of the Australian television show Fat Cat and Friends and the mascot of the Channel Seven Perth Telethon
Fat Cat, a character in the animated series Chip 'n Dale Rescue Rangers
Obesity in pets